Staying Together may refer to:
 "Staying Together" (song), a 1988 single from American singer-songwriter-actress Debbie Gibson 
 Staying Together (film), a 1989 American comedy-drama film